Bosnia and Herzegovina Waterpolo League is a national water polo league played in Bosnia and Herzegovina. It was launched on December 12, 2009. All participating teams are in Sarajevo.

Teams Participating
VK Bosna
GKVS-Sarajevo Gradski klub vodenih sportova-Sarajevo
UVK Mladost
PVK Vidra
VK Forma

Winners
2009-2010 - VK Bosna

2009-2010 Season

Regular season

All results can be obtained at: https://web.archive.org/web/20190202130829/http://www.olimpijskibazensarajevo.ba/

References

Water polo leagues in Europe